The Spartans Drum and Bugle Corps is an Open Class competitive junior drum and bugle corps. Based in Nashua, New Hampshire, the Spartans performs in Drum Corps International (DCI) competitions. The Spartans won the DCI Division II World Championship in 1997, 1998, 2004, 2005, and 2007, and in 2019 won the DCI Open Class Championship that replaced Divisions II and III in 2008.

History
Source:

The Spartans Drum and Bugle Corps was founded in 1955 by Albert LaFlamme. LaFlamme was succeeded as corps director by his son, Peter. Today, the corps is run by Albert's grandson, Paul LaFlamme.

A fire in 1999 destroyed nearly everything the corps owned: instruments, uniforms, equipment, vehicles. The dedication of the corps' members, staff, and supporters, as well as the greater drum corps community, kept the corps in operation and in competition, with the corps placing second that year at DCI Division II Finals in Madison, Wisconsin.

Despite being DCI Division II Champions five times, in 2009, the economic downturn known as the "Great Recession" forced the Spartans into bankruptcy. Bingo revenues had dropped off to a point where the corps discontinued that fundraising activity. Efforts to sell the corps hall had not been successful. The corps went through a year of inactivity and reorganized, including a change of management and sale of the corps hall. The corps then successfully returned to competition in 2010.

Since returning to the DCI competition field in 2010, the Spartans have never placed outside the top 5 in the Open Class championship. The corps has also qualified for World Class semi finals consecutively since 2012, regularly finishing above a number of World Class corps.

In 2019, ten years after the corps went inactive, the Spartans were crowned the undefeated champions of the 2019 DCI Open Class Championship, scoring 81.050 and taking a clean sweep of all captions besides percussion.

Show summary (1972–2022)
Source:

Traditions

Corps song 

The Spartans corps song is "Fire of Eternal Glory" By Dmitri Shostakovich.

References

External links
Official website

Drum Corps International Open Class corps
Musical groups established in 1955
Organizations based in New Hampshire
1955 establishments in New Hampshire